Members of the New South Wales Legislative Council between 1949 and 1952 were indirectly elected by a joint sitting of the New South Wales Parliament, with 15 members elected every three years. The most recent election was on 31 March 1949, with the term of new members commencing on 23 April 1949. The President was Ernest Farrar.

This election gave Labor a majority in the Legislative Council, its first since the re-constitution of the council in 1934, giving it a majority in both houses of parliament. The Labor Party expelled four members of the Legislative Assembly before the 1950 election - James Geraghty (North Sydney), John Seiffert (Monaro), Roy Heferen (Barwon) and Fred Stanley (Lakemba) for not following the party's endorsed ticket in the Legislative Council election, apparently voting for  Bill McNamara who was 9th on the Labor ticket.

See also
Second McGirr ministry
Third McGirr ministry

References

Members of New South Wales parliaments by term
20th-century Australian politicians